Robert Martin Filson (born 25 June 1968) is an English former professional footballer who played as a defender. He made appearances in the English Football League for Wrexham.

References

External links

1968 births
Living people
English footballers
Association football defenders
Everton F.C. players
Preston North End F.C. players
Wrexham A.F.C. players
Rhyl F.C. players
Bath City F.C. players
Stalybridge Celtic F.C. players
Hyde United F.C. players
Halifax Town A.F.C. players
Caernarfon Town F.C. players
Droylsden F.C. players
Boston United F.C. players
Northwich Victoria F.C. players
Leek Town F.C. players
Bangor City F.C. players
Dagenham & Redbridge F.C. players
English Football League players